Myrtlebury is an Iron Age enclosure or 'spur' hill fort situated close to Lynmouth in Devon, England. The fort is effectively the north east of a hillside forming a spur or promontory above the steep valley of the East Lyn River to the east of the village, at approximately 150 metres above sea level.

References

Hill forts in Devon
Lynton and Lynmouth